The Thirteenth Anniversary tour was a triumph both financially and critically for the Residents.  It was also the last time Snakefinger would work with them, as he died of a heart attack in 1987. The official album release of The Thirteenth Anniversary Show in 1987 was a recording of the show in Japan. There was also a recording of the show in the United States that was released to UWEB fan club members in the late 1980s, and various outtakes and bootlegs of other performances of the show exist as well.

The track list below is for the cassette edition, as this was also the track list used for the ESD reissue in the late 1990s.

Track listing
"Jailhouse Rock"
"Where Is She"
"Picnic in the Jungle"
"Passing the Bottle*" 
"Monkey and Bunny"
"Theme from an American TV Show**"
"It's a Man's Man's Man's World"
"Smelly Tongues"
"Eloise"
"Ships a Going Down*"
"Tourniquet of Roses*"
"Easter Woman"
"Amber"
"Red Rider"
"Die in Terror"
"Coming of the Crow"
"Eva's Warning"
"Cry for the Fire"

These songs included on the cassette version only upon release in 1986.
Track included, but not listed, on LP or cassette.

Track Listing for 1999/2000 CD Re-Release
 Lizard Lady
 Semolina
 Hello Skinny/Constantinople
 Jailhouse Rock
 Where Is She?
 Picnic in the Jungle
 Smelly Tongues
 Eloise
 Ship's a Goin' Down
 The New Machine
 Tourniquet of Roses
 Passing the Bottle
 Monkey and Bunny
 Theme from an American TV Show
 Man's World
 Walter Westinghouse
 Easter Woman
 Amber
 Red Rider
 Die in Terror
 The Coming of the Crow/Eva's Warning
 Cry for the Fire

Notes
The original album was released on Wave Records in Japan with longer versions of the songs and the tracks included on the U.S. cassette release.  It also had a different name: The Eyeball Show.

The album was released on Bomba Records in Japan in 1999 as The 13th Anniversary Show, Live in Tokyo.  This version was released on East Side Digital in the United States in 2000.

Thirteenth Anniversary Show, The
Thirteenth Anniversary Show, The